An  Electron first-stage booster is a reusable rocket stage used on the Rocket Lab Electron launch vehicle. It is made of a carbon composite developed and manufactured by Rocket Lab. In 2019, Rocket Lab announced plans to recover and reuse the first stage of Electron despite previously dismissing the idea. Flight 16 was the first launch to test recovery procedures followed by flight 20 which, despite a failed primary mission, still achieved a successful Splashdown recovery and flight 22. On 5 April 2022, Rocket Lab announced that flight 26 would feature the first full recovery attempt with a helicopter catch. The flight launched on 2 May 2022 UTC from launch pad 1A in Mahīa. While the Sikorsky S-92 was able to intersect the booster mid-air, the booster was released at the pilot's discretion after an unexpectedly large increase in mass. The booster parachuted into the ocean where it was recovered by ship.

List of boosters

Electron or Electron/Curie

Electron/Photon 

The Photon kick-stage is an optional extra on the Electron launch vehicle allowing for heavier payload capacity or higher altitudes/interplanetary missions. The kick-stage was first used on Electron's 14th flight (Rocket Lab's return to launch after the "Pics Or It Didn't Happen" failure).

References

Rocket Lab
Electron